Bruce Wayne Tuckman (November 24, 1938 – March 13, 2016) was an American Psychological Researcher who carried out his research into the theory of group dynamics. In 1965, he published a theory known as "Tuckman's stages of group development".

According to his theory, there are four phases of group developmen, they were: Forming, Storming, Norming, Performing. In 1977, he added a fifth stage, named Adjourning.

Tuckman was also known for his research on college students' procrastination and development of the Tuckman Procrastination Scale (1991).

He served as professor of educational psychology at Ohio State University, where he founded and directed the Walter E. Dennis Learning Center with the mission of providing students of all backgrounds with strategies for college success that enabled them to enter, excel in, and complete programs of post-secondary education.

To teach students strategies for succeeding in college, he co-authored the textbook, Learning and Motivation Strategies: Your Guide to Success, with Dennis A. Abry and Dennis R. Smith.

Educational background
Rensselaer Polytechnic Institute: 1960 graduated with B.S. Psychology. Born in Surrey.
Princeton University: 1962 graduated with M.A. Psychology
Princeton University: 1963 graduated with Ph.D. Psychology
In 1991 Tuckman researched and developed a 32-item Procrastination Scale that measured the degree to which a person procrastinated.
Professor Tuckman was also an avid runner who wrote the novel Long Road to Boston (1998).

Bibliography
 Tuckman, Bruce W. (1965) ‘Developmental sequence in small groups’, Psychological Bulletin, 63, 384–399.
 Tuckman, Bruce W. and Jensen, Mary Ann C. (1977) ‘Stages of Small-Group Development Revisited’, Group & Organization Studies, 2(4),419–427.

References

 Smith, M. K. (2005). ‘Bruce W. Tuckman – forming, storming, norming and performing in groups, the encyclopaedia of informal education. Retrieved: 2014-07-25.

External links
Bruce W. Tuckman
DLC: Founding Director

Social psychologists
1938 births
2016 deaths
20th-century American psychologists